The 1946–47 season was the 63rd official Scottish football season in which Dumbarton competed at national level,  and the first where Scottish football got back to normal after the end of WW2.  Dumbarton entered the Scottish Football League, the Scottish Cup, the inaugural Scottish League Cup and the Supplementary Cup. In addition Dumbarton competed in the Stirlingshire Cup.

Scottish Football League

Scottish football returned to normal after an absence of seven seasons. Dumbarton played in Division B and finished a disappointing 13th out of 14 with 18 points - 27 behind champions Dundee.

Supplementary Cup
The Supplementary Cup for B Division teams continued, but Dumbarton fell at the first hurdle to Alloa.

League Cup

Following the success of the format of the Southern League Cup played during wartime conditions, the inaugural League Cup was played but Dumbarton failed to progress from their section, finishing 3rd of 4 with just 2 wins from 6 games.

Scottish Cup

The return of the Scottish Cup brought much cheer, and after dispatching A Division opponents St Mirren and Third Lanark, Dumbarton lost out narrowly to Hibernian in the fourth round.

Stirlingshire Cup
East Stirling defeated Dumbarton in the first round after a drawn match.

Friendlies
Two 'friendly' matches were arranged.  One against A Division Partick Thistle and the other against a team of Polish internationalists, billed as a Polish Army XI who were touring post-war Europe.

Player statistics

|}

Source:

Transfers

Players in

Players out 

Source:

In addition James Brown, John Getty, Thomas Jess, Gordon McFarlane, Victor McAloney, Bernard McDonald, William Neil, Bobby Ross and Robert Torrance would all have played their last 1st team game for Dumbarton before the end of the season.

Reserve team
Dumbarton entered the Scottish Second XI Cup but lost in the first round to Albion Rovers.

References

Dumbarton F.C. seasons
Scottish football clubs 1946–47 season